Highway 984 is a provincial highway in the east central region of the Canadian province of Saskatchewan. It runs from Highway 23 near Somme to a dead end near the Piwei River Recreation Site. Highway 984 is about 18 km (11 mi) long. 

Highway 984 also connects with Highway 983.

See also
Roads in Saskatchewan
Transportation in Saskatchewan

References

984